This is a list of conference champions in sports sponsored by the Pac-12 Conference.

Current members

Affiliate members

Former members

No school has left the Pac-12 since its founding as the AAWU in 1959.  Two members of the PCC never joined the AAWU.

Baseball 

Bold text indicates National Champion
* Pacific Coast Conference playoff champion
** North-South playoff champion
† California won the CIBA Division 1 and USC won Division 2. Cal defeated USC in a playoff for the CIBA title.
‡ Won the tiebreaker and the automatic post-season bid
Arizona State won the 1969 and 1977 National Championships as a member of the Western Athletic Conference. The Sun Devils' first baseball season in the Pac-12 was 1979. 
Arizona won the 1976 National Championship as a member of the WAC. The Wildcats also joined the Pac-10 for the 1979 baseball season.
Arizona won the 1986 National Championship but did not win the South Division 
Stanford won the 1988 National Championship but did not win the South Division. The Cardinal defeated South Division champion Arizona State in the final 
USC won the 1998 National Championship, defeating Arizona State in the final. Neither won the South Division
Oregon State won the 2007 and 2018 National Championships but did not win the conference championships for those years.
UCLA won the 2013 National Championship but did not win the conference championship.

Men's basketball 

The Pacific Coast Conference began playing basketball in the 1915-16 season. The PCC was split into North and South Divisions for basketball beginning with the 1922-23 season. The winners of the two divisions would play a best of three series of games to determine the PCC basketball champion. If two division teams tied, they would have a one-game playoff to produce the division representative. Starting with the first NCAA Men's Basketball Championship in 1939, the winner of the PCC divisional playoff was given the automatic berth in the NCAA tournament. Oregon, the 1939 PCC champion, won the championship game in the 1939 NCAA Men's Division I Basketball Tournament.

The last divisional playoff was in the 1954-55 season. After that, there was no divisional play and all teams played each other in a round robin competition. From the 1955-56 season through the 1958-59 season, the regular season conference champion was awarded the NCAA tournament berth from the PCC. In the case of a tie, a tie breaker rule was used to determine the NCAA tournament representative.

Beginning with the 1975 NCAA Men's Division I Basketball Tournament, the Pac-10 would usually place at least one other at-large team in the tournament.

By the 1985-86 season, the Pac-10 was one of three remaining conferences that gave their automatic NCAA tournament bid to the regular season round-robin champion. The other two conferences were the Ivy League and the Big Ten Conference.

The modern Pac-12 Conference men's basketball tournament format began in 1987. It was dropped after 1990 upon opposition from coaches and poor revenue and attendance.

The tournament was restarted by an 8-2 vote of the athletic directors of the conference in 2000 after determining that a tournament would help increase exposure of the conference and help the seeding of the schools in the NCAA tournament.

Women's basketball 

Bold text denotes National Champion.

Beach Volleyball 

The Pac-12 first sponsored beach volleyball in the 2016 season (2015–16 school year). According to the Pac-12, the conference "did not record official league standings during the inaugural season of Beach Volleyball." To this day, the conference has never recorded official league standings in the sport. The regular season is followed by a conference tournament, with championships held both for pairs and teams (consisting of five pairs).

Bold text denotes National Champion.

Men's Cross Country 

Bold text denotes National Champion.Note: Oregon won the 1974 National Title. Colorado won the 2001, 2004 & 2006 National Title but was not a member of the Pac-12

 Women's Cross Country Bold text denotes National Champion.Note: Oregon won the 2016 National Title. Colorado won the 2000 & 2004 National Title but was not a member of the Pac-12

Football

Men's Golf 

Bold text denotes National Champion.Note: Arizona won the 1992 National Title.  Arizona State was the 1994 Co―National Champions.  California won the 2004 National Title.  Oregon won the 2016 National Title.  Stanford won the 2007 National Title.  UCLA won the 2008 & 1988 National TitlesNote: Scott Simpson (USC) won the 1977 Individual National Title.  Ron Commans (USC) won the 1981 Individual National Title.  Jim Carter (ASU) won the 1983 Individual National Title.  Phil Mickelson (ASU) won the 1989 & 1992 Individual National Titles.  Todd Demsey (ASU) won the 1993 Individual National Titles.  Alejandro Cañizares (ASU) won the 2003 Individual National Title.  James Lepp (Washington) won the 2005 Individual National Title.  Kevin Chappell (UCLA) won the 2008 Individual National Title.  Cameron Wilson (Stanford) won the 2014 Individual National Title.  Aaron Wise (Oregon) won the 2016 Individual National Title.

Women's Golf 

Bold text denotes National Champion.Note: Arizona won the 1996 & 2018 National Title. Arizona State won the 1990 & 2017 National Title.  Stanford won the 2015 National Title.  USC won the 2003 National Title.  UCLA won the 2011 National Title.  Washington won the 2016 National TitleNote: Susan Slaughter (ASU) won the 1990 Individual National Title.  Annika Sorenstam (Arizona) won the 1991 Individual National Title.  Emilee Klein (Arizona State) won the 1991 Individual National Title.  Kristel Mourgue d’Algue (Arizona State) won the 1995 Individual National Title.  Jennifer Rosales (USC) won the 1995 Individual National Title.  Jenna Daniels (USC) won the 2000 Individual National Title.  Mikaela Parmlid (USC) won the 2003 Individual National Title.  Sarah Huarte (California) won the 2004 Individual National Title.  Dewi Schreefel (USC) won the 2006 Individual National Title.  Azahara Muñoz (Arizona State) won the 2008 Individual National Title.  Doris Chen (USC) won the 2014 Individual National Title.  Monica Vaughn (2017) won the 2017 Individual National Title.  Rose Zhang (2022) won the 2022 Individual National Title.

 Women's Gymnastics 

Note: Bold denotes NCAA team or all-around champion.
Note: The Pac-10 added gymnastics in the 1987 season. Prior to the Pac-10 fielding gymnastics championships, Jackie Brummer from Arizona State won the NCAA gymnastics championship.
Note: The following gymnasts won the NCAA all-around title without winning the Pac-10 all-around title: 2001: Onnie Willis, UCLA; 2002: Jamie Dantzscher, UCLA; 2008: Tasha Schwikert, UCLA; 2015: Samantha Peszek, UCLA

 Women's Lacrosse 

Note: Bold denotes NCAA team champion.
Note: The 2020 Season was stopped due to the COVID-19 Pandemic.

 Men's Rowing 

Note: Bold denotes NCAA team champion.
Note: The 2020 Season was stopped due to the COVID-19 Pandemic.

 Women's Rowing 

Note: Bold denotes NCAA team champion.
Note: The 2020 Season was stopped due to the COVID-19 Pandemic.
Note: California won the 2018 National Title.Stanford won the 2009 National Title.

 Men's Soccer 
The conference established men's soccer as a sponsored sport beginning in the 2000 academic year. Prior to then, most members who fielded a men's collegiate soccer team competed in the Mountain Pacific Sports Federation.

Note: Arizona, Arizona State, Colorado, Oregon, USC, Utah & Washington State do not field a men's soccer team.Bold text indicates National Champion

Women's Soccer 
The conference established women's soccer as a sponsored sport beginning in the 1995 academic year.

Bold text indicates National Champion

Softball 

Note: UCLA won the 1992, 1995 (vacated), 2003, 2004 and 2010 National Championship but did not win the conference championshipNote: Arizona won the 1991, 1993, and 1996 National Championship but did not win the conference championshipNote: California won the 2002 National Championship but did not win the conference championshipNote: Washington won the 2009 National Championship but did not win the conference championship
Note: Washington State, Colorado, and USC do not field softball teams
Bold text indicates National Champion

Men's Swim & Dive 

Bold text denotes National Champion.Note: Arizona won the 2008 National Title.  California won the 1979 National Title.

Women's Swim & Dive 

Bold text denotes National Champion.

Men's Tennis 

Bold text denotes National Champion.Note: The 2020 Season was stopped due to the COVID-19 Pandemic.
Note:  Stanford won the 1973, 1977, 1981, 1986, 1988, 1989, 1990, 1992, 1996 Team National Title.  UCLA won the 1950, 1953, 1979, 1984, 2008 Team National Titles.  USC won the 1976 Team National Title.
Note:  The 2008 UCLA Conference Championship was vacated due to playing an ineligible player & awarded to USC.

Women's Tennis 

Bold text denotes National Champion.Note: The 2020 Season was stopped due to the COVID-19 Pandemic.
Note:  Stanford won the 1982, 1984, 1986, 1987, 2013 Team National Titles.  UCLA won the 2014 Team National Title.  USC won the 1983, 1985 Team National Titles 
Note:

Men's Swim & Dive 

Bold text denotes National Champion.Note: Arizona won the 2008 National Title.  California won the 1979 National Title.

Men's Track & Field 

Bold text denotes National Champion.Note: Arizona State won the 1977 National Title. Oregon won the 1962 & 1964 National Title.  UCLA won the 1978 National Title.  USC won the 1965 National Title.
Note: The 2020 Season was stopped due to the COVID-19 Pandemic.

Women's Track & Field 

Bold text denotes National Champion.
Note: The 2020 Season was stopped due to the COVID-19 Pandemic.

Women's Indoor Volleyball 

Bold text indicates National Champion

Wrestling

Bold text indicates National Champion

References

External links
Pac-12 Champions – full list of past champions

Pac-12 Conference
Pac-12